Siquijor Airport , is a community feeder aerodrome serving the general area of the town of Siquijor, located in the province of Siquijor in the Philippines.

The airport is classified as a community airport by the Civil Aviation Authority of the Philippines.

Airport facelift and expansion
On March 1, 2018, upgrade works in the airport begun. The airport upgrade project covers the construction of a new passenger terminal building, a power station, and a vehicle parking area. Construction was finished on July 30, 2021, and was later inaugurated on August 26. Other upgrade works in the airport includes the runway extension and asphalt overlay, scheduled to be completed in June 2022.

Terminal and structures

Terminal building
Prior to the airport upgrade, the old passenger terminal building can only accommodate 10 passengers. The new terminal building now handles 50-60 passengers, with plans to expand it up to 100.

Runway
Prior to the airport upgrade, the airport has a  gravel runway that runs in a 04/22 direction.

Airlines and destinations

See also
List of airports in the Philippines

References

External links
 Siquijor Airport
 CAAP

Airports in the Philippines
Siquijor